Ruhaini Matdarin (born 16. 3. 1981, Kota Kinabalu) is a Malaysian writer from Sabah.

Brief biography 
She is Kadazan by nationality. The eldest of three children in the family. In 2003, she graduated from the Faculty of Finance Management of the University of Science of Malaysia in Penang. She used to work as an auditor in a number of companies. Since 2016, she has become a freelancer in order to have free time for writing and run her business. Life member of the Writers' Union of Malaysia.

Creativity 
She began writing as a student of Sabah College in 2000. She promptly burst into the world of literature. Debuting in 2007 with the novel “The Self-Right Girl”, she published over 30 books during the next ten years, including novels and collections of short stories, as well as literary processed Sabah fairy tales. At the same time, many of her works were awarded prestigious awards, including the Sabah Literary Award which she got many times. It seems that the virtue of her books is in her capability to describe what is happening nowadays in Malaysia with humor, and sometimes with undisguised satire, resorting to the paradox as an artistic mean, changing the usual perception of life.  She emerged as an important name in the transition era literature in Malaysia and one of the best novelist in Malaysia. Some of her short stories are translated into Russian by Victor A. Pogadaev.

Awards 
 Sabah Literature Prize (2006/2007, 2008/2009, 2010/2011, 2012/2013, 2014/2015, 2016/2017)
 Literary Prize of the Utusan Group (2010, 2012, 2013, 2014)
 Winner of the best book competition of the Malaysian Institute of Translation & Books, National Union of Writers of Malaysia and "Berita Harian" (2014).
 Hadiah Sastera Perdana 2017/2018

Works

Novels 
 Gadis Adikara. Kuala Lumpur: Cerdik Publication, 2007
 Jendela Menghadap Jalan. Kuala Lumpur: Utusan Publication, 2009
 Pesona Sandora: Misteri di Provinsi Terpencil. Kuala Lumpur: PTS, 2010
 Nurbalkis. Kuala Lumpur: DBP, 2010
 Nisan. Kuala Lumpur: Penerbitan Melur, 2011
 Waris Pejuang. Kuala Lumpur: Utusan Publication, 2012
 Dukana. Kuala Lumpur: ITBM, 2013
 Anatomi Rupert. Kuala Lumpur: ITBM, 2013.
 Di Seberang Jalan. Kuala Lumpur: ITBM, 2014.
 Kotak. Kuala Lumpur: Utusan Publications.
 Dalam Getar Waktu. Kuala Lumpur: Utusan Publication, 2014
 Cerita Perang Bariga. Kuala Lumpur: HSKU, 2015
 Trivia. Kuala Lumpur: ITBM, 2015
 Ajal. Kuala Lumpur: Utusan & UTM Press, 2015 (science fiction)
 Sekurun Mencari Sinar. Kuala Lumpur: DBP, 2015
 Kafe. Kuala Lumpur: DBP, 2018
 Hari-Hari Terakhir Di Jesselton. Kuala Lumpur: DBP, 2018
Kenangan Melankolik Perempuan Pendamping Waktu: NUSA Centre, 2020
Yang Mendekat dan Menjauh:DBP, 2020

Collections of short stories 
 Misi Penyepit Kain. Kuala Lumpur: ITBM, 2013
 Melawan Yang Mustahil. Kuala Lumpur: ITBM, 2014
 Jenaka si Darah Legenda. Kuala Lumpur: ITBM, 2015
 Bulan Tenggelam Dalam Perahu. Kuala Lumpur: DBP, 2015
 Short Story Collection: Against All Odds (Terjemahan daripada Melawan Yang Mustahil). Kuala Lumpur: ITBM, 2016.
 Fiksi Buat Marquez. Kuala Lumpur: DBP, 2017
 Cerita Yang Merayap-Rayap Di Dermaga. Kuala Lumpur: DBP, 2018
 Kanvas Merah Jambu Van Gogh. Kuala Lumpur: Nusa Buku VS ITBM, 2018
Cerita Orang-Orang Sunyi, Nusa Centre, 2020

In collective anthologies 
 Istana Cinta Ayah. Anatologi cerpen pemenang sayembara mengarang cerpen sempena 50 tahun Merdeka. Kuala Lumpur: DBP, 2009 (cerpen Yang Aneh)
 Emas Hitam. Antologi cerpen hadiah sedco-bahasa ke 2. Kuala Lumpur: Penerbitan Melur, 2010 (Cerpen Emas Hitam)
 Karya sasterawan. Kuala Lumpur: BTN, ITNM & Pena, 2011 (cerpen Loran)
 Antologi cerpen Indonesia-Malaysia. Kuala Lumpur: Buku Obor & ITBM, 2013 (cerpen Bendera Yang Kembali Berkibar)
 Cerpen terbaik 2014. Kuala Lumpur: Fixi, 2015 (cerpen Basikal Terbang Dan Misteri Kematian Profesor Jabbar)
 Yang Aneh Yang Magis. Kuala Lumpur: KataPilar Books, 2017 cerpen Misi Penyepit Kain.
Antologi bersama Anwar Ridwan dan SM Zakir - Perempuan yang jatuh dari langit, cerpen moden Melayu diterjemahkan ke Bahasa Rusia, 2019

Tales of Sabah 
 Puteri Bungsu dan Suluwaden. Kuala Lumpur: DBP, 2014
 Puteri Bintang Terang. Kuala Lumpur: DBP, 2015

Notes

References

1981 births
Living people
Malaysian writers
Malay-language writers
Malay-language literature
Kadazan-Dusun people
Malaysian Muslims
People from Sabah
Universiti Sains Malaysia alumni
Malaysian literature
Malaysian science fiction writers